Upton is a home rule-class city in Hardin and LaRue counties in the U.S. state of Kentucky. The population was 683 at the 2010 census. Its entire area is included in the Elizabethtown–Fort Knox Metropolitan Statistical Area.

History
Upton was founded in 1841, and was initially known as "Leesville."  It was renamed in 1856 in honor of George Washington Upton, who had helped develop the area as a stop along the L&N Railroad.

Upton was one of the targets of Confederate John Hunt Morgan during the Civil War. Upton was on the L&N Railroad, one of the key north-south railroads for the Union. The train station and nearby bridges were attacked during the day on December 26, 1862. The Union forces were quickly defeated and Morgan took advantage of the telegraph station in Upton to gather intelligence on Union troop disposition. Morgan then left Upton to destroy bridges at nearby Bacon Creek in Bonnieville and on the Nolin River.

Geography
Upton is located on the Hardin County/LaRue County line at  (37.462175, -85.895335), near the southeast and southwest corners, respectively, of the two counties. U.S. Route 31W passes through the center of the city and follows the county line.  The two-lane highway leads north  to Sonora and south  to Bonnieville. Much of Upton is concentrated around the intersection of US 31W and Kentucky Route 224, which runs westward in the direction of Leitchfield. Interstate 65 runs along Upton's eastern boundary, with access from Exit 76. I-65 leads north  to Elizabethtown, the Hardin County seat, and south  to Cave City.

Demographics

As of the census of 2000, there were 654 people, 283 households, and 189 families residing in the city. The racial makeup of the city was 96.79% White, 0.76% African American, 0.15% Pacific Islander, 0.15% from other races, and 2.14% from two or more races. Hispanic or Latino of any race were 0.46% of the population.

There were 283 households, out of which 24.7% had children under the age of 18 living with them, 55.1% were married couples living together, 8.8% had a female householder with no husband present, and 32.9% were non-families. 30.4% of all households were made up of individuals, and 16.3% had someone living alone who was 65 years of age or older. The average household size was 2.31 and the average family size was 2.86.

The age distribution was 22.0% under the age of 18, 8.3% from 18 to 24, 27.1% from 25 to 44, 24.0% from 45 to 64, and 18.7% who were 65 years of age or older. The median age was 41 years. For every 100 females, there were 97.0 males. For every 100 females age 18 and over, there were 88.2 males.

The median income for a household in the city was $26,250, and the median income for a family was $31,477. Males had a median income of $26,111 versus $19,375 for females. The per capita income for the city was $13,886. About 8.3% of families and 14.2% of the population were below the poverty line, including 17.5% of those under age 18 and 18.4% of those age 65 or over.

References

External links

Cities in Hardin County, Kentucky
Cities in LaRue County, Kentucky
Cities in Kentucky
Elizabethtown metropolitan area